The Anatolian lizard (Apathya cappadocica) is a species of lizard endemic to Iran, Iraq, Syria and Turkey.

Subspecies
 Apathya cappadocica cappadocica (Werner, 1902)
 Apathya cappadocica muhtari (Eiselt, 1979)
 Apathya cappadocica urmiana Lantz & Suchow, 1934
 Apathya cappadocica wolteri Bird, 1936

References

Apathya
Reptiles of Iran
Reptiles of Iraq
Reptiles of Turkey
Endemic fauna of Iran
Reptiles described in 1902
Taxa named by Franz Werner